Richard Austin Peterson (September 28, 1932 – February 4, 2010) was an American sociologist and Emeritus Professor of Sociology at Vanderbilt University.

Early life and education 

Richard Peterson was born in Mussoorie, British India, where his father was a missionary. He graduated from Oberlin College with a bachelor's, and attended graduate school at University of Illinois at Urbana–Champaign, where he worked with the sociologist Alvin Gouldner and completed his PhD in 1962 In 1965, Peterson received a job in the sociology department at Vanderbilt University in Nashville, Tennessee. It was there that he began to study the country music scene in-depth.

He was the founding chairman of the American Sociological Association's culture section, and the section's prize for the best graduate student paper is named in honor of him. He was a major contributor to the "production of culture" perspective within the sociology of culture, and a widely known scholar of popular music, country-western in particular. Peterson's highly-cited book Creating Country Music: Fabricating Authenticity "is one of the most important scholarly works ever written about the genre". 

The journal Poetics released a special double issue devoted to the contributions of Peterson to the sociology of culture.

Works
Peterson, R.A. and Simkus, A. (1992) 'How Musical Tastes Mark Occupational Status Groups', in M. Lamont and M. Fournier (eds) Cultivating Differences , pp 152—86. Chicago: University of Chicago Press.

 

Peterson, R.A. (2005) 'Problems in Comparative Research: The Example of Omnivorousness' , Poetics 33(5—6): 257—82 .
.

References 

1932 births
2010 deaths
People from Mussoorie
American sociologists
Oberlin College alumni
University of Illinois Urbana-Champaign alumni
Vanderbilt University faculty